Diklo is a village in the historical region of Tusheti, Georgia. Administratively, it is part of the Akhmeta Municipality in Kakheti. It lies between the Greater Caucasus Mountain Range and the Pirikita Range of Tusheti.

See also
 Kakheti

Sources 
 Georgian Soviet Encyclopedia, V. 3, p. 551, Tbilisi, 1978 year.

References

Populated places in Kakheti